Nathan Den Hoedt (born 6 January 1997) is an Australian rugby union player, currently playing for the LA Giltinis of Major League Rugby (MLR). His preferred position is lock.

Professional career
Den Hoedt signed for Major League Rugby side LA Giltinis ahead of the 2021 Major League Rugby season.

References

External links
itsrugby.co.uk Profile

1997 births
Living people
Australian rugby union players
Rugby union locks
LA Giltinis players
Rugby union flankers
Brisbane City (rugby union) players
New South Wales Country Eagles players
Houston SaberCats players